DeWitt "Snuffy" Jenkins (October 27, 1908 – April 29, 1990) was an American old time banjo player and an early proponent of the three-finger banjo style.

Biography
Jenkins was born in Harris, North Carolina, as the last of ten children. He began playing the fiddle as a plucked instrument, switched to guitar and later to a home-made banjo he and his brother Verl had built. He bought his first real banjo in 1927, and soon fell under the influence of  Smith Hammett and Rex Brooks, two early banjo players who did much for the development of Jenkins' style. In 1934, he appeared on the radio show Crazy Water Barn Dance over WBT in Charlotte, North Carolina with his newly formed group, the Jenkins String Band. The string band comprised Snuffy Jenkins on banjo, his brother Verl Jenkins on fiddle and a cousin on guitar. During this time, Jenkins also played in the W.O.W. String Band.

In 1936, he joined J. E. Mainer's Mountaineers as banjo player performing at local radio station WSPA in Spartanburg. The next year, in 1937, the Mountaineers were hired to perform over WIS in Columbia. The announcer of radio station WIS was Byron "The Old Hired Hand" Parker and he almost immediately took over the Mountaineers renaming them  Byron Parker's Hillbillies. The Hillbillies, consisting of J. E. Mainer on fiddle, Jenkins on banjo, George Morris and Leonard Stokes on guitars, later recorded - without Byron Parker - under the name of J. E. Mainer's Mountaineers. J. E. Mainer soon left, and was replaced by Verl Jenkins on fiddle and Clyde Robbins on guitar.

In 1939, Parker hired Homer Sherrill on fiddle; Mainer, Stokes and Morris had left earlier. Parker changed the group's name to The WIS Hillbillies and in 1947, Julian "Greasy" Medlin, a guitar player and a veteran of the medicine show circuit, along with the bass player Ira Dimmery were added to the Hillbillies. The WIS Hillbillies mainly did minstrel shows with comedy skits as Jenkins dressed up in baggy pants while "Greasy" wore blackface. It was around this time Byron Parker gave Jenkins his nickname "Snuffy" because he used to wipe his nose with his sleeve during one of the skits. Byron Parker died in 1948, and Jenkins and Sherrill, who had taken over the band, changed  its name to The Hired Hands in Parker's memory.

In 1949, Sherrill and Jenkins recorded with Jim Eanes on two sides of a 78 rpm release for Capitol. In 1953, The Hired Hands appeared on television at WIS-TV and in 1955, they added guitarist Bill Rea. In 1956, folklorist Mike Seeger recorded Jenkins (accompanied by Ira Dimmery on guitar) for a Folkways sampler album of three-finger banjo styles.  The Hired Hands first recorded as a group for Folk-Lyric in 1962. During the 1960s, they performed on several folk and bluegrass festivals.

When Jenkins was semi-retired in the 1960s he worked as a car salesman in South Carolina.

In 1979, the surviving members of The Hired Hands were invited to stage an old time medicine show in the hamlet of Bailey, North Carolina. The success of the show led the North Carolina Public Television to produce the "Free Show Tonight" which aired over PBS. The Hired Hands also performed their medicine show at the Smithsonian Institution and in 1983, at the American Place Theater in New York City.

Legacy
Despite persistent rumours, Jenkins did not teach Earl Scruggs how to play the banjo, according to an interview with Jenkins, conducted by Tony Trischka on October 17, 1984. On the other hand, there is no doubt that Jenkins did indeed influence Don Reno with his picking and Scruggs does name Jenkins as a major influence.

A music festival, recently revived after a 20-year hiatus, in honor of Snuffy Jenkins is held annually in Rutherford County, NC (Snuffy's birthplace).  The Snuffy Jenkins Festival features bluegrass and old-time music, and includes historical talks and discussions of Snuffy's life and music as well as related discussions about the contributions of other innovative banjo players from the region:  Rex Brooks, Smith Hammett, and Earl Scruggs.

Discography

Footnotes

References
 Bogdanov, Vladimir - Woodstra, Chris - Erlewine, Stephen Thomas (2003) All Music Guide to Country: The Definitive Guide to Country Music
 Carlin, Richard (2003) Country Music: A Biographical Dictionary
 Erbsen, Wayne (2003) Laura Boosinger, Rural Roots of Bluegrass: Songs, Stories & History
 Jones, Loyal (2008) Country Music Humorists and Comedians
 Russell, Tony (2007) Country Music Originals: The Legends and the Lost
 Scully, Michael F. (2008) The Never-Ending Revival: Rounder Records and the Folk Alliance
 Trischka, Tony - Wernick, Pete (1988) Masters of the 5-String Banjo, 1988

External links
 

Singer-songwriters from North Carolina
American banjoists
American country singer-songwriters
1908 births
1990 deaths
20th-century American singers
People from Rutherford County, North Carolina
Country musicians from North Carolina